Apinun Khongsong (born July 14, 1995), also known professionally as Downua Ruawaiking (ดาวเหนือ เรือไวกิ้ง), is a Thai professional boxer who challenged for the unified WBA (Super), IBF, and The Ring light-welterweight titles in September 2020.

Boxing career
He has been through a lot of fighting from Muay Thai and amateur boxing over 100 fights. He is a sports athlete of Trang Sports School.

He debut his first professional boxing match in mid-2016 under Ekarat "่Jimmy" Chaichotchuang of Kiat Kreerin Promotion by Rian Munton, a Briton as a trainer. In his 7th fight, he challenged  vacant IBF Pan Pacific champion with Yuta Maruoka, a Japanese boxer he beat by knockout just first round on February 22, 2017.

On August 23, 2017, he defended his title by unanimous decision over Adam Diu "Big Daddy" Abdulhamid a Filipino challenger at Suan Lum Night Bazaar Ratchadaphisek.

On February 18, 2019, in the  eliminator fight for IBF junior welterweight world title, he knockout Japanese boxer Akihiro Kondo with right uppercut in round 5 at Kōrakuen Hall, Tokyo.

On September 26, 2020, he lost for the first time when losing by knockout to Josh Taylor in the first round in  unified WBA (Super), IBF, and The Ring light-welterweight bout at York Hall, London.

References

External links
 

Living people
1995 births
Apinun Khongsong
Apinun Khongsong
Light-welterweight boxers